The 30th annual National Geographic Bee was held in Washington, D.C. and was hosted by Mo Rocca. It is sponsored by the National Geographic Society. The State Bees were held on April 6, where the 54 finalists were determined.  The 2018 National Geographic Bee champion was Venkat Ranjan of California.

State Bees
On April 6, 2018, the National Geographic State Bees were held across the 50 states, Washington, D.C., the Atlantic Territories, the Pacific Territories, and the Department of Defense. Fifty-four State or Territory level Champions were determined. In 2018, the prize for winning the state bee has been raised, as $200 is now given to the winner instead of $100, the old prize. The winners have also received a National Geographic Visual Atlas of the World, Second Edition. Second and third place winners received $150 and $100, respectively. The state preliminary rounds (there were 8 total) consisted of rounds about U.S. geography, international geography, current events, national birds, protecting the environment, Weird but True, and a “GeoChallenge”. The GeoChallenge was a True/False round where a statement would be made about a U.S. state’s population, GDP, or size, comparing it to another country, and the student would have to say if it was True or False. For example, one question was “Virginia has a higher GDP than Portugal, True or False?”-the answer is true.   All 54 regional champions received an all-expenses paid trip to Washington, D.C. to compete at the national competition from May 20-23.

Preliminary rounds
The 54 state champions competed in the preliminary rounds held from May 21-22, 2018. This part of the contest consisted of 10 oral rounds as well as a written portion.

The top 10 contestants with the highest scores in the preliminary rounds competed in the final round, which was held on May 23, 2018. Venkat Ranjan from California was the champion, with Anoushka Buddhikot from New Jersey coming 2nd, and Vishal Sareddy from Georgia placing third.

Krishna Kamalakannan of North Dakota also finished with 17 out of 20 points, but was eliminated by a tiebreaker test the students had taken specifically for the purpose of breaking ties.

References

2018 in Washington, D.C.
2018 in education
May 2018 events in the United States
National Geographic Bee